Guy Donald Boros (born September 4, 1964) is an American professional golfer who currently plays on the PGA Tour Champions. He previously played on the PGA Tour and the Nationwide Tour. He is the son of Hall of Fame golfer Julius Boros.

Boros was born in Fort Lauderdale, Florida. He attended the University of Iowa and was a three-time All-Big Ten member of the golf team. He turned pro in 1986.

Boros has played on the PGA Tour and the Nationwide Tour in relatively equal amounts over the course of his career recording about a dozen top-10 finishes in each venue. He has one victory in an official PGA Tour event and three wins in Nationwide Tour events. His best finish in a major championship is a T-36 at the 1995 U.S. Open.

In addition to the PGA Tour and the Nationwide Tour, Boros played for four years on the Canadian Tour and two years on the PGA Tour of Australasia. In 1991, Boros was the leading money winner on the Canadian Tour with a win at the British Columbia Open. He lives in Pompano Beach, Florida.

Professional wins (6)

PGA Tour wins (1)

Nationwide Tour wins (3)

Nationwide Tour playoff record (0–1)

Canadian Tour wins (2)
1989 Atlantic Classic
1991 British Columbia Open

Results in major championships

CUT = missed the half-way cut
"T" = Tied
Note: Boros never played in The Open Championship.

See also
1993 PGA Tour Qualifying School graduates
2003 Nationwide Tour graduates

External links

American male golfers
PGA Tour golfers
PGA Tour Champions golfers
Korn Ferry Tour graduates
Golfers from Florida
Iowa Hawkeyes men's golfers
Sportspeople from Fort Lauderdale, Florida
People from Pompano Beach, Florida
1964 births
Living people